The medial circumflex femoral artery (internal circumflex artery, medial femoral circumflex artery) is an artery in the upper thigh that arises from the profunda femoris artery. It supplies arterial blood to several muscles in the region, as well as the femoral head and neck.

Damage to the artery following a femoral neck fracture may lead to avascular necrosis (ischemic) of the femoral neck/head.

Structure

Origin 
The medial femoral circumflex artery arises from the posteromedial aspect of the profunda femoris artery.

The medial femoral circumflex artery may occasionally arise directly from the femoral artery.

Course and relations 
It winds around the medial side of the femur to pass along the posterior aspect of the femur. It first passes between the pectineus and the iliopsoas muscles, then between the obturator externus and the adductor brevis muscles.

Branches

At the upper border of the adductor brevis it gives off two branches:
 The ascending branch
 The descending branch descends beneath the adductor brevis, to supply it and the adductor magnus; the continuation of the vessel passes backward and divides into superficial, deep, and acetabular branches. 
 The superficial branch 
 The deep branch 
 The acetabular branch

Distribution 
The medial femoral circumflex artery (with its branches) supplies arterial blood to several muscles, including: the adductor muscles of the hip, gracilis muscle, pectineus muscle, and external obturator muscle. It delivers most of the arterial supply to the femoral head and femoral neck via branches - the posterior retinacular arteries.

Clinical significance 
Branches of the medial circumflex femoral artery supplying the head and neck of the femur are often torn in femoral neck fractures and in hip dislocation.

See also
 Lateral femoral circumflex artery

References

Additional Images

External links
 
  - "Arteries of the lower extremity shown in association with major landmarks."

Arteries of the lower limb